Dyscritaspis is a genus of mites in the family Polyaspididae. There is at least one described species in Dyscritaspis, D. whartoni.

References

Mesostigmata
Articles created by Qbugbot